Group B of the 2009 Fed Cup Asia/Oceania Zone Group I was one of two pools in the Asia/Oceania Zone Group I of the 2009 Fed Cup. Four teams competed in a round robin competition, with the top team and the bottom two teams proceeding to their respective sections of the play-offs: the top teams played for advancement to the World Group II Play-offs, while the bottom teams faced potential relegation to Group II.

Chinese Taipei vs. Thailand

Australia vs. South Korea

Chinese Taipei vs. South Korea

Australia vs. Thailand

Chinese Taipei vs. Australia

South Korea vs. Thailand

See also
 Fed Cup structure

References

External links
 Fed Cup website

2009 Fed Cup Asia/Oceania Zone